The Spanish Grand Prix is a Formula One motor racing event currently held at the Circuit de Barcelona-Catalunya. The race is one of the oldest in the world still contested, celebrating its centenary in 2013. The race had modest beginnings as a production car race. Interrupted by the First World War, the race waited a decade for its second running before becoming a staple of the European calendar. In 1927 it was part of the World Manufacturers' Championship; it was promoted to the European Championship in 1935 before the Spanish Civil War brought an end to racing. The race was successfully revived in 1967 and has been a regular part of the Formula One World Championship since 1968 (except 1982–1985) at a variety of venues.

The event is due to take place at the Circuit de Barcelona-Catalunya until at least 2026.

History

Origins and pre-war
The first race generally considered to be a Spanish Grand Prix was held in 1913. Though not run to the Grand Prix formula of the day, instead it was a race for touring cars, taking place on a 300-kilometre road circuit at Guadarrama, near Madrid, on the road to Valladolid. It was officially named the RACE Grand Prix (after the Royal Automobile Club of Spain) and was won by Carlos de Salamanca with Rolls-Royce.

Motor racing events had taken place in Spain prior to that—the most notable among them being the Catalan Cup held annually from 1908 to 1910, on roads around Sitges, near Barcelona. The first event was won by Giosuè Giuppone on a Lion-Peugeot, with both following events won by Jules Goux, also driving a Lion-Peugeot, these races helping to establish a strong racing tradition in Spain, which has continued to this day. This enthusiasm for racing led to the plan to build a permanent track at Sitges—a  oval that became known as Sitges-Terramar, and was the site of the first race to officially carry the title Spanish Grand Prix in 1923, won by Albert Divo in a Sunbeam.

Lasarte
After this first race, the track fell into financial difficulties, and the organisers had to look for another venue. In 1926, the Spanish Grand Prix moved to the  Circuito Lasarte on the northern coast near Bilbao, home of the main race in Spain during the 1920s—the San Sebastián Grand Prix. The 1927 Spanish Grand Prix was part of the AIACR World Manufacturers' Championship, but the race was still not established and in 1928 and 1929 was run to sports car regulations. The 1930 Spanish Grand Prix for sports cars, scheduled for 27 July, was cancelled due to the bad economic situation following the Wall Street crash in October 1929. The 1931 and 1932 Spanish Grands Prix were also announced, only to be cancelled due to political and economic difficulties. Finally, in 1933 the Spanish Grand Prix was revived at Lasarte with government backing. Following the 1935 race, Spain descended into civil war and racing stopped. In 1946, racing returned to Spain in the form of the Penya Rhin Grand Prix at the Pedralbes street circuit in Barcelona.

Formula One

Pedralbes

Spain did not return to the international calendar until 1951, joining the list of races of the Formula One championship at the very wide Pedralbes street circuit in Barcelona. Argentine Juan Manuel Fangio won his first world championship at the 1951 event in an Alfa Romeo while he took advantage of the improved works Ferrari's tire problems. The race was scheduled for the 1952 and 1953 seasons but did not take place due to a lack of money, and in 1954, Briton Mike Hawthorn stopped Mercedes's dominance by winning in a Ferrari. In 1955, the Spanish Grand Prix at Pedralbes was scheduled to take place, but a terrible accident at the 24 Hours of Le Mans that killed more than 80 people resulted in regulations governing spectator safety, and the scheduled Spanish Grand Prix (like many others) was cancelled that year and for the subsequent 2 years (also owing to more problems with money to hold the race), and the wide but pedestrian-lined street track at Pedralbes was then never used again for motor racing.

Jarama and Montjuïc

In the 1960s, Spain made a bid to return to the world of international motor racing—the Royal Automobile Club of Spain commissioned a new permanent racing circuit just north of Madrid at Jarama, and the Spanish government refurbished the Montjuïc street circuit in Barcelona with safety upgrades. A non-championship Grand Prix took place at Jarama in 1967, which was won by Jim Clark racing in a Lotus F1 car.

In 1968, Jarama hosted the Spanish Grand Prix, near the beginning of the F1 season. It was agreed, following this event, that the race would alternate between the tight, slow and twisty Jarama and the fast, wide and sweeping Montjuïc, and the Montjuïc circuit hosted its first Formula One race in 1969, with Briton Jackie Stewart winning. Jarama would get the race in even-numbered years, and Montjuïc in odd-numbered years. 1970 was a race that saw Belgian Jacky Ickx and Briton Jackie Oliver get involved in a fiery accident; with Ickx and Oliver escaping with burns. The race was won by Stewart, he won again the next year after holding off 3 more powerful 12-cylinder engined cars. Austrian Niki Lauda won his first of 25 races in 1974. The 1975 event was marked by tragedy. There had been concerns about track safety during practice races, as the Armco barriers surrounding the city streets of the Montjuïc circuit had not been fastened down properly. There were a number of protests, and the drivers refused to race. The organizers panicked, and they threatened to lock the cars inside the stadium where they stayed while not being raced. The drivers and teams relented; but double-winner Emerson Fittipaldi retired in protest after a single lap. On the 26th lap of the race, Rolf Stommelen's car crashed when the rear wing broke off, killing four spectators. The race was stopped on the 29th lap and won by Jochen Mass, though only half the points were awarded.

Jarama

After the tragic events at the dangerously fast and tight space of Montjuïc, the Spanish Grand Prix was confined to Jarama. The 1976 race saw Briton James Hunt take advantage of Lauda's broken ribs in a tractor accident; he was then disqualified after his McLaren was found to be 1.8 inches too wide. McLaren appealed the decision, and it was successful; Hunt's points were restored. 1977 and 1978 saw Mario Andretti dominate in his ground-effect Lotus 78. The 1980 race was of note, because on the Friday morning of race weekend, FISA president Jean-Marie Balestre announced the Spanish Grand Prix would not be counted as a championship race. As a result, none of the factory teams (Ferrari, Renault and Alfa Romeo) showed up for the event and only the independent constructors belonging to FOCA competed. The race was won by Alan Jones in a Williams. 1981 was a race that Gilles Villeneuve in his ill-handling Ferrari held off 4 better-handling cars to take victory on the twisty and confined circuit; this is considered one of the greatest drives in all motorsports. But the Spanish Grand Prix at Jarama was then also dropped from the racing calendar after being cancelled in 1982 because the organizers seemed more interested in the golf course near the circuit, and because of the narrow track, unpleasantly hot late June conditions, and small crowd at that year's race; it would return in 1986.

Jerez

An attempt to revive the Spanish Grand Prix on a street circuit in the southwestern resort town of Fuengirola for 1984 and 1985 did not work out; but in 1985, the Mayor of Jerez commissioned a new racing circuit in his town to promote tourism and sherries. The track, the Circuito Permanente de Jerez, located near Seville in southern Spain was finished in time for the  championship, which saw a furious battle between Ayrton Senna and Nigel Mansell, with the two cars finishing side by side. Senna won by 0.014 seconds—one of F1's closest finishes. 1987 saw Mansell win in his Williams; and 1989 saw Senna drive a hard race to keep himself in the championship points; he won the event from Austrian Gerhard Berger in a Ferrari and the Brazilian's fierce rival and McLaren teammate, Frenchman Alain Prost. The 1990 event was the last Spanish Grand Prix at Jerez (although Jerez did stage the European Grand Prix in 1994 and 1997). During the practice, Martin Donnelly's Lotus was destroyed in a high-speed crash, and the Briton was ejected from the car. He was severely injured, but survived; he never raced in Formula One again. Jerez's remote location did not help build large crowds for the race, combined with Donnelly's appalling crash into Armco barriers close to the track did nothing to help Jerez's reputation; although the circuit was popular with the F1 fraternity. Ferrari finished first and second in the race, with Prost finishing ahead of Mansell.

Catalunya

Work on the Circuit de Barcelona-Catalunya was underway in Montmeló, few kilometres from Barcelona, thanks to the support of the Spanish government, and in 1991, the event moved to this new track, where it has remained since. The 1992 event was advertised as the Grand Prix of the Olympic Games. Since that race the race has been held in early season, usually in late April or early May.

The Williams team dominated the first outings there, taking all victories until 1994. Michael Schumacher has won a total of six times, including his 1996 victory in heavy rain, which was his first for Ferrari. Mika Häkkinen took three victories and was on road for fourth in 2001 before his car failed on the last lap.

Since 2003 the race has been well attended thanks to success of Fernando Alonso. Alonso finished second in 2003 and 2005 before taking victory from pole in 2006. Alonso also finished third in 2007, with two further second places in 2010 and 2012, where he finished behind the Williams of Spanish speaking Pastor Maldonado, who won from pole; this was the first win and pole in a Grand Prix for a Venezuelan driver and Williams's first win since the 2004 Brazilian Grand Prix and the team's first Spanish Grand Prix win and pole since 1997.
Two Spanish drivers have won the Spanish Grand Prix; Carlos de Salamanca in 1913 and Alonso in 2006 and 2013, with Spanish speaking Juan Manuel Fangio winning in 1951 as well as Maldonado in 2012.

From , the Spanish Grand Prix was due to alternate every year between Catalunya and the Valencia Street Circuit. However, this did not happen—Valencia dropped out for financial reasons and Catalunya remained the sole host of the Spanish Grand Prix.

Only four of the 19 races at this track between 2001 and 2019 have not been won from pole position.

The 2020 race was postponed from May to August due to the COVID-19 pandemic.

Lewis Hamilton won the 2021 edition after passing Max Verstappen after making an additional pit stop.

Winners of the Spanish Grand Prix

Multiple winners (drivers) 
Drivers in bold are competing in the Formula One championship in the current season
A pink background indicates an event that was not part of the Formula One World Championship.

Multiple winners (constructors) 
Teams in bold are competing in the Formula One championship in the current season.
A pink background indicates an event that was not part of the Formula One World Championship.
A yellow background indicates an event that was part of the pre-war European Championship.

Multiple winners (engine manufacturers) 
Manufacturers in bold are competing in the Formula One championship in the current season.
A pink background indicates an event that was not part of the Formula One World Championship.
A yellow background indicates an event that was part of the pre-war European Championship.

* Designed and built by Cosworth, funded by Ford

** Between 1998 and 2005 designed and built by Ilmor, funded by Mercedes

By year

A pink background indicates an event that was not part of the Formula One World Championship.
A yellow background indicates an event that was part of the pre-war European Championship.
''A green background indicates an event that was part of the pre-war World Manufacturers' Championship.

* Sports car race 
† Officially named as RACE Grand Prix

See also
 San Sebastián Grand Prix

References

External links

 Circuit de Catalunya official website (click on English to change language)
 Spanish Grand Prix Statistics
 Catalunya F1 statistics

 
Formula One Grands Prix
Formula One non-championship races
Pre-World Championship Grands Prix
National Grands Prix
Recurring sporting events established in 1913
1913 establishments in Spain